George T. Kersey (died January 8, 1946) was a state legislator in Illinois. He was a Republican who served in the Illinois House of Representatives from 1923 to 1925 and from 1927 to 1931. He was an undertaker. The New York Public Library has a photograph of him. W. E. B. Du Bois wrote to him requesting a biographical account of Kersey's life.

In 1923 he supported a successful bill for a monument to African American veterans in Chicago. Victory Monument is in Bronzeville. His address was listed as 3515 Indiana Avenue in Douglas, Chicago,

He died in Chicago at age 80.

References

This draft is in progress as of October 18, 2022.

Illinois politicians

Year of birth missing
1946 deaths